The Trial is a 2014 Philippine family-drama film directed by Chito S. Roño and starring John Lloyd Cruz, Richard Gomez, Gretchen Barretto, Enrique Gil and Jessy Mendiola. It was produced and released by Star Cinema for its 20th anniversary.

Premise
Ronald (John Lloyd Cruz), a mentally challenged man, was put into trial after allegedly raping his teacher Bessy (Jessy Mendiola). As Amanda (Gretchen Barretto), Julian (Richard Gomez), and Ronald try to mount a convincing defense, they discover soon that they're all connected in more ways than just the case.

Cast

 John Lloyd Cruz as Ronald Jimenez Jr.
 Gretchen Barretto as Amanda Bien
 Richard Gomez as Julian Bien
 Jessy Mendiola as Bessy Buenaventura
 Enrique Gil as Martin Bien
 Sylvia Sanchez as Sampi Jimenez
 Vincent De Jesus as Ronald Jimenez Sr.
 Vivian Velez as Lallie Lapiral
 Benjamin Alves as Paco Sequia
 Alonzo Muhlach as Junjun
 Isay Alvarez as Atty. Patricia Celis
 Joy Viado† as Dora 
 Mon Confiado as Borta
 Nico Antonio as Paco's friend
 Gee Canlas as Megan
 Lui Manansala as Mrs. Deputado

References

External links

2014 films
Philippine romantic drama films
Philippine legal films
Philippine crime thriller films
Philippine thriller drama films
2010s Tagalog-language films
Films about Filipino families
Films about lawyers
Philippine LGBT-related films
Star Cinema films
Films directed by Chito S. Roño
Courtroom films
2010s English-language films